Xin'an County is a county in the west of Henan Province, bordering Shanxi Province to the north across the Yellow River. It is under the administration of the prefecture-level city of Luoyang, and contains its northernmost point.

History
In ancient China, Xin'an was a county located to the west of Luoyang, former capital of the Zhou Dynasty (1049-256 BCE). The archaeological site of the Hanguguan gate dates back to this time and is thus enlisted by UNESCO as part of the world heritage site “Silk Roads”.

Administrative divisions
As 2012, this county is divided to 10 towns and 1 township.
Towns

Townships
Caocun Township

Climate

References

 
Luoyang
County-level divisions of Henan